Electoral district no. 2 was one of the multi-member electoral districts of the Riigikogu, the national legislature of Estonia. The district was established in 1992 when the Riigikogu was re-established following Estonia's independence from the Soviet Union. It was abolished in 1995. It covered north Tallinn.

Election results

Detailed

1992
Results of the 1992 parliamentary election held on 20 September 1992:

The following candidates were elected:
 District mandates - Arvo Vallikivi (I), 2,896 votes.
 Compensatory mandates - Ants Erm (ERSP), 642 votes; Toivo Jürgenson (I), 581 votes; Tõnu-Reid Kukk (KK), 427 votes; Ants-Enno Lõhmus (R), 270 votes; Edgar Spriit (KK), 266 votes; and Heido Vitsur (KK), 1,627 votes.

References

02
02
02
Riigikogu electoral district, 2